Hollie Hughes may refer to:

 Hollie Hughes (horse trainer) (1888–1981), US trainer of Thoroughbred racehorses
 Hollie Hughes (politician) Australian politician